Blond is a hair color.

Blond or Blondes may also refer to:

Blond (surname)
Blond, Haut-Vienne, France
Blond Bay State Game Reserve, Australia

Entertainment
Blond (band), a Swedish boy band
Blond, the alternative name that Swedish pop band Tages used between 1969–1970
Blonds (band), an American indie pop band
Blonde (Frank Ocean album)
The Blonds, a short nickname of the name for The Hollywood Blonds, a name used by several professional wrestling tag teams

See also
Blonde (disambiguation)